EFHS may refer to:
 East Forsyth High School (North Carolina), Kernersville, North Carolina, United States
 Edsel Ford High School, Dearborn, Michigan, United States
 Elizabeth Forward High School, Elizabeth, Pennsylvania, United States
 Estrella Foothills High School, Goodyear, Arizona, United States